Lost in a Dream is a live album by jazz drummer Paul Motian recorded at the Village Vanguard in 2009 and released on the ECM label. It features tenor saxophonist Chris Potter and pianist Jason Moran.

Reception

John Fordham, writing for The Guardian commented: "The trio demonstrates sublime improvising musicianship and flawlessly creative listening at once". The PopMatters review by Will Layman stated: "Lost in a Dream faces serious competition, but it should rank high on anyone’s list of superb Paul Motian recordings... This group’s combination of balladry and excitement, texture and melody, individual personality and group simpatico makes Lost in a Dream a serious standout". All About Jazz correspondent John Kelman commented, "Lost In A Dream may be the first salvo from this empathic new trio, but hopefully it won't be the last". Phil Johnson, in a review for The Independent, commented: "With no great variation in method the listener has a lot of work to do, but the pitter-patter of the drums' uneven pulse cues in some beautiful music".

Track listing
All compositions by Paul Motian except as indicated
 "Mode VI" - 5:09
 "Casino" - 8:05
 "Lost in a Dream" - 6:39
 "Blue Midnight" - 6:09
 "Be Careful It's My Heart" (Irving Berlin) - 2:58
 "Birdsong" - 6:52
 "Ten" - 4:29
 "Drum Music" - 6:07
 "Abacus" - 4:25
 "Cathedral Song" - 6:29

Personnel
Paul Motian - drums
Chris Potter - tenor saxophone
Jason Moran - piano

References 

2010 live albums
Paul Motian live albums
ECM Records live albums
Albums recorded at the Village Vanguard
Albums produced by Manfred Eicher